Munden may refer to:

 Munden (surname)
 Munden, Kansas, a town in the United States
 Munden House, an estate in Hertfordshire, England
 Munden Point, Virginia, United States
 Great Munden, a village and civil parish in Hertfordshire, England
 Hann. Münden, a town in Germany
 Little Munden, a civil parish in Hertfordshire, England

See also
 
 Minden (disambiguation)
 Mundane (disambiguation)